Tengragiri Eco Park is a wildlife sanctuary located near Taltali in Barguna District of Bangladesh. The sanctuary is locally known as Fatrarban.
|url=http://www.regionalwildlife.gov.bd/protected-areas/wildlife-sanctuaries.html |website=Strengthening Regional Cooperation for Wildlife Protection Project |accessdate=11 June 2020}}</ref>

The forest was given the name Tengragiri in 1967 and during that time it covered an area of estimated 13,644 acres. It was declared as a reserved forest by the then Pakistan government on 12 July 1960 based on the survey conducted in the area during the British period in 1927. The area was officially declared as a wildlife sanctuary by the government of Bangladesh on 24 October 2010.

See also
 List of wildlife sanctuaries of Bangladesh
Tengragiri Eco Park

References 

Wildlife sanctuaries of Bangladesh